Dzhabar Askerov (born January 24, 1986) is a Russian Welterweight kickboxer fighting out of Melbourne, Australia and representing Russia. He is the World Muay Thai Council's Muay Thai Welterweight European Champion and K-1 MAX Scandinavia 2008 Tournament Finalist.

Background
Askerov was born in Kurah, Dagestan in an ethnic Lezgin family. When he was six years old, he went to school in Magaramkent and his father took him to a judo gym where he trained for two years. When Askerov was nine years old, his family moved to Derbent. It was his father again who took Askerov to a Muay Thai gym where he fell in love with the sport.

Career

Early career
Dzhabar had his first professional fight when he was 18, a four-man tournament which he won. A few years later, Askerov moved to Thailand to train with the best at the birthplace of his beloved sport, settling at Rompo Gym in Bangkok. In November 2012 he moved to Melbourne, Australia and began training at Fighters Xpress with trainer Peter Hatton.

Dzhabar made his K-1 debut on March 17, 2007, at the K-1 MAX East European Tournament against Muay Thai superstar Buakaw Por. Pramuk and lost the fight by unanimous decision.

The Contender Asia 
In 2008 Dzhabar took part in The Contender Asia reality show. He was part of the Tiger Kings team and reached the semi finals where he was defeated by John Wayne Parr.

Post-Contender
Askerov was signed by Thai boxing company Yokkao in 2012 as a sponsored fighter. He faced Buakaw Banchamek (then-Buakaw Por Pramuk) at the main event for Yokkao Extreme 2012 on January 21, 2012, in Milan, Italy. Askerov lost by points to Buakaw after the 3-round battle.  

He was expected to face Yoshihiro Sato in a tournament reserve bout at Glory 3: Rome - 2012 Middleweight Slam Final 8 on November 3, 2012, in Rome, Italy. However, Sato was given a place in the tournament when Albert Kraus pulled out with the flu and Warren Stevelmans instead stepped in against Askerov. Stevelmans beat him by unanimous decision.

He defeated Mohamed El Mir by TKO when El Mir was injured checking a low kick in round three at Rumble of the Kings 2012 on November 16, 2012, in Linköping, Sweden.

He was expected to fight Steve Moxon at Kings of Kombat 8 on December 8, 2012, in Melbourne, Australia but withdrew from the bout and was replaced by Mostafa Abdollahi.

He was awarded a highly disputed decision over 20-year-old German Enriko Kehl at NewFC: Battle of the Stars in Dagestan on December 22, 2012.

Askerov took possibly the biggest win of his career on January 26, 2013, when he defeated the legendary Andy Souwer by split decision at Yokkao Extreme 2013 in Milan, Italy.

Askerov was expected to face Toby Smith at Domination 10 in Perth, Australia on March 9, 2013 but the bout was cancelled when the two men could not agree over the rule-set; Smith wanted to fight under Muay Thai rules, while Askerov preferred kickboxing.

Askerov lost to Steve Moxon via split decision at Kings of Kombat 9 in Melbourne on April 27, 2013.

He was expected to face Mike Zambidis in the semi-finals of the Legend Fighting Show -71 kg tournament in Moscow, Russia on May 25, 2013. However, Zambidis was replaced by Enriko Gogokhia. After dispatching Gogokhia with what Fight Sport Asia described as "one of the nastiest 70kg knockouts in recent history", he faced Alim Nabiev in the final. He outclassed Nabiev, who was filling in for the injured Artur Kyshenko, and stopped him with low kicks in round three to take the tournament crown.

Askerov defeated Yoshihiro Sato by unanimous decision at Tech-Krep FC: Southern Front 2 in Kyiv, Ukraine on December 8, 2013.

On April 5, 2014, Askerov was scheduled to fight Artur Kyshenko at Legend 3: Pour Homme in Milan, Italy, but the Ukrainian withdrew from the fight, conceding that he would be unable to make the contracted weight of -71 kg/156 lb, and was replaced by his stablemate Murthel Groenhart. Askerov lost to Groenhart, getting dropped with a right hook before being put away with a left hook inside the opening round.

On December 15, 2015, he was ranked the #8 lightweight in the world by LiverKick.com.

Titles

Professional
 Alpha Fight Series
 2019 Alpha Fight Series World Champion (-70 kg)
 Russian Challenge 
 2017 Russian Challenge World Champion (-71 kg)
 2016 Russian Сhallenge World Champion (-71 kg)
 Legend Fighting Show 
 2013 Legend Fighting Show 71 kg Tournament Champion
 2012 W5 European Champion 71 kg
 International Amateur Kickboxing Sport Association
 2012 IAKSA European Champion-72.5 kg.
 Fights by TNA Rules
 2011 Fights by TNA RULES TNA World Cup –70 kg
 2010 Fights by TNA RULES TNA World Cup –70 kg
 World Muaythai Council (WMC) 
 2008 WMC Muay Thai Middleweight European Champion –72.5 kg
 2006 W.M.C./S1 Kings Cup runner up –72 kg
 2005 W.M.C. "Muay Thai Against Drugs" Tournament World Champion
 Shoot Boxing / S-Cup 
 2008 S-Cup 2008 Europe Shootboxing Tournament runner up –70 kg
 K-1
 2008 K-1 Scandinavia MAX tournament runner up –70 kg
 2006 K-1 Russia MAX runner up –70 kg
 World version W5
 2008 Wins the WMC Welterweight European Championship Title -71 kg
 Patong Stadium 
 2005 Patong Stadium Muaythai Super Welterweight Champion -68 kg
 PK-1
 2004 PK-1 World Champion

Amateur
2003 I.F.M.A. World Muay Thai Championships  -57 kg
2000 Pancration World Junior Championship 
1999 Muaythai World Junior Championship

Professional boxing record

|-  bgcolor="#CCFFCC" 
| 2016-08-06 || Win ||align=left| Michael Mora ||Tesla - Energy of a Victory || Moscow, Russia || Decision (Unanimous) || 6 || 3:00
|-
| colspan=9 | Legend:

Professional kickboxing record 
{{Kickboxing record start|norec=y|title=Professional Kickboxing record|record=110 Wins (55 (T)KO's), 54 decision)  37 Losses, 2 Draw,  No Contest}}

|-  style="background:#fbb;"
| 2023-03-12 || Loss ||align=left| Masaaki Noiri  || K-1 World GP 2023: K'Festa 6 || Tokyo, Japan  || KO (Right straight) || 1 || 2:00

|-  bgcolor="#CCFFCC"
| 2022-04-09|| Win ||align=left| Jonathan Aiulu || Warriors Way 25: GP Fight Night || Melbourne, Australia || Decision (Split)  || 3 || 3:00  

|-  bgcolor="#CCFFCC"
|  2019-12-13 || Win || align="left" | Jonathan Tuhu || Alpha Fight Series || Melbourne, Australia || TKO || 4 || 2:42
|-
! style=background:white colspan=9 |
|-
|-  style="background:#fbb;"
|  2019-08-16 || Loss || align="left" | Samy Sana || ONE Championship: Dreams of Gold || Bangkok, Thailand || Decision (Majority) || 3 || 3:00
|-
! align="center" style="background:white" colspan=8 | 
|-
|-  bgcolor="#CCFFCC"
|  2019-05-17 || Win || align="left" | Enriko Kehl || ONE Championship: Enter the Dragon || Kallang, Singapore || Decision (Unanimous)  || 3 || 3:00
|-
! style="background:white" colspan=8 | 
|-  style="background:#fbb;"
|-  bgcolor="#CCFFCC"
| 2018-04-20 || Win || align=left| Ergali Urbulatov || ACB KB 15: Grand Prix Kitek || Moscow, Russia || Decision (Unanimous)  || 3 || 3:00
|-  style="background:#fbb;"
| 2017-10-07 || Loss ||align=left| Sitthichai Sitsongpeenong || Wu Lin Feng - Yi Long challenge Tournament, Final || Zhengzhou, Henan, China  || Decision (Unanimous) || 3 || 3:00
|-  style="background:#fbb;"
| 2017-08-05 || Loss  || align="left| Chingiz Allazov || Wu Lin Feng - Yi Long challenge Tournament Semi Finals || Zhengzhou, China || Decision (Unanimous)  || 3 || 3:00
|-  bgcolor="#CCFFCC"
| 2017-05-06 || Win ||align=left| Christopher Mena || Wu Lin Feng -  Yi Long challenge Tournament 1/4 finals 2 || Zhengzhou, Henan, China  || KO (left cross) || 1 || 2:43
|-  bgcolor="#CCFFCC" 
| 2017-03-19 || Win ||align=left| Rhassan Muhareb || Russian Сhallenge 3 || Moscow, Russia || Extension round decision (Unanimous) || 4 || 3:00
|-
! style=background:white colspan=9 |
|-  bgcolor="#CCFFCC" 
| 2016-11-13 || Win ||align=left| Mohamed Reza Nazari ||  Russian Сhallenge 2 Grand Prix Moscow || Moscow, Russia || TKO (corner stoppage) || 2 || 3:00
|-
! style=background:white colspan=9 |
|-  style="background:#fbb;"
| 2016-10-30 || Loss ||align=left| Dzianis Zuev || Kunlun Fight 54 - Super Fight || Wuhan, China || Extension round decision (Unanimous) || 4 || 3:00
|-  style="background:#fbb;"
| 2016-05-14 || Loss ||align=left| Yassin Baitar || Kunlun Fight 44 - Four Man Tournament, Semi Finals || Khabarovsk, Russia || Decision (Unanimous) || 3 || 3:00
|-  style="background:#c5d2ea;" 
| 2016-03-25 || Draw ||align=left| Warren Stevelmans || Kunlun Fight 40  || Tongling, China || Extension round decision || 4 || 3:00
|-  bgcolor="#CCFFCC"
| 2016-01-23 || Win ||align=left| Aikpracha Meenayothin || Kunlun Fight 37 – World Max 2015 Reserve Fight || Sanya, China || KO (right hook)  || 2 || 2:12
|-  style="background:#fbb;"
| 2015-10-31|| Loss ||align=left| Yodsanklai Fairtex || Kunlun Fight 33 – World Max 2015 Final 16 || Changde, China || Decision || 3 || 3:00
|-  style="background:#cfc;"
| 2015-08-15 || Win ||align=left| Liu Mingzhi || Kunlun Fight 29 - Middleweight Tournament, Final || Sochi, Russia || TKO (Ref stop/three knockdowns by lowkicks) || 1 || 2:05
|-
! style=background:white colspan=9 |
|-  style="background:#cfc;"
| 2015-08-15 || Win ||align=left| Enriko Kehl || Kunlun Fight 29 - Middleweight Tournament, Semi Finals || Sochi, Russia || KO ( right hook) || 2 || 2:19
|-  style="background:#cfc;"
| 2015-02-26 ||Win ||align=left| Nonsai Sor.Sanyakorn || Grand Prix Russia Open Vol. 16 || Moscow, Russia ||Decision (Unanimous) || 3 || 3:00
|-  style="background:#fbb;"
| 2014-11-30 || Win ||align=left| Cosmo Alexandre || W5 Crossroad of Times, Semi Finals || Bratislava, Slovakia || Decision (unanimous) || 3 || 3:00
|-  style="background:#cfc;"
| 2014-06-07 || Win ||align=left| Steve Moxon || Moment of Truth || Keysborough, Australia || Decision (Unanimous) || 5 || 3:00
|-  style="background:#fbb;"
| 2014-04-05 || Loss ||align=left| Murthel Groenhart || Legend 3: Pour Homme || Milan, Italy || KO (left hook)|| 1 || 2:08
|-  style="background:#cfc;"
| 2013-12-08 ||Win|| align=left| Yoshihiro Sato || Tech-Krep FC: Soldiers of the Empire || Kyiv, Ukraine || Decision (Unanimous)|| 3 || 3:00
|-  style="background:#cfc;"
| 2013-10-04 || Win || align=left| Marco Groh || Tech-Krep FC: Southern Front 2 || Krasnodar, Russia || Decision (Unanimous) || 3 || 3:00
|-  style="background:#cfc;"
| 2013-05-25 || Win ||align=left| Alim Nabiev || Legend Fighting Show, Final || Moscow, Russia || KO (left low kick) || 3 || 1:32
|-
! style=background:white colspan=9 |
|-  style="background:#cfc;"
| 2013-05-25 || Win ||align=left| Enriko Gogokhia || Legend Fighting Show, Semi Finals || Moscow, Russia || KO (left hook) || 2 || 2:18
|-  style="background:#fbb;"
| 2013-04-27 || Loss ||align=left| Steve Moxon || Kings of Kombat 9 || Melbourne, Australia || Decision (split) || 3 || 3:00
|-  style="background:#cfc;"
| 2013-03-16 || Win ||align=left| Ben Sisam|| Night of Mayhem 6,Pro Boxing || Melbourne, Australia ||Decision (Unanimous) || 4 || 3:00
|-  style="background:#cfc;"
| 2013-03-02 || Win  ||align=left| Mohammed Medhar || Tech-KREP FC 1 – Southern Front || Kransnodar, Russia || Decision (Unanimous) || 3 || 3:00
|-  style="background:#cfc;"
| 2013-01-26 || Win  ||align=left| Andy Souwer || Yokkao Extreme 2013 || Milan, Italy || Decision (split) || 3 || 3:00
|-  style="background:#cfc;"
| 2012-12-22 || Win ||align=left| Enriko Kehl || NewFC: Battle of the Stars || Makhachkala, Russia || Decision || 3 || 3:00
|-
! style=background:white colspan=9 |
|-  style="background:#cfc;"
| 2012-11-16 || Win ||align=left| Mohamed El Mir || Rumble of the Kings 2012 || Linköping, Sweden || TKO (leg injury) || 3 || 0:46
|-  style="background:#fbb;"
| 2012-11-03 || Loss  ||align=left| Warren Stevelmans || Glory 3: Rome - 70 kg Slam Tournament, Reserve Bout || Rome, Italy || Decision (unanimous) || 3 || 3:00
|-  style="background:#cfc;"
| 2012-09-15 || Win  ||align=left| Mike Dimitriou || Night of MAYHEM-5 || Melbourne, Australia ||KO ||1 ||  0:45
|-  style="background:#cfc;"
| 2012-06-07 ||Win ||align=left| Danila Utenkov || Fight Nights-7 || Moscow, Russia || TKO||2 ||  2:56
|-  style="background:#fbb;"
| 2012-05-26 || Loss ||align=left| Robin van Roosmalen || Glory 1: Stockholm - 70 kg Slam Tournament, First Round || Stockholm, Sweden || Decision || 3 || 3:00
|-  style="background:#cfc;"
| 2012-04-05 ||Win ||align=left| Mandela Antone || Tatneft Cup quarter final || Kazan, Russia || TKO||2 ||  2:00
|-  style="background:#cfc;"
| 2012-03-23 || Win ||align=left| Maxim Vorovski || United Glory 15 || Moscow, Russia || Ex.Round. Decision || 4 || 3:00
|-  style="background:#cfc;"
| 2012-03-08 || Win ||align=left| Jeremy Sportouch || Fight Nights 6 || Moscow, Russia || Decision || 3 || 3:00
|-  style="background:#cfc;"
| 2012-02-25 || Win ||align=left| Ramzan Magomadov || IAKSA Event || Derbent, Russia || TKO || 2 || 1:00
|-
! style=background:white colspan=9 |
|-  style="background:#fbb;"
| 2012-01-21 || Loss ||align=left| Buakaw Por. Pramuk || Yokkao Extreme 2012 || Milan, Italy  || Decision || 3 || 3:00
|-  style="background:#cfc;"
| 2011-11-27 || Win ||align=left| Chahid Oulad El Hadj || Rumble of the Kings 2011 || Stockholm, Sweden || TKO (retirement) || 1 || 1:07
|-  style="background:#cfc;"
| 2011-11-12 || Win ||align=left| Maxim Smirnov || Tatneft Cup 2011 Final || Kazan, Russia  || KO (knee) || 3 || 1:43
|-
! style=background:white colspan=9 |
|-  style="background:#cfc;"
| 2011-07-23 || Win ||align=left| Enriko Gogokhia|| Tatneft Cup 2011 1/2 final || Kazan, Russia || Decision || 4 || 3:00
|-  style="background:#cfc;"
| 2011-04-28 || Win ||align=left| Martin Anwar|| Tatneft Cup 2011 2nd selection 1/4 final || Kazan, Russia || TKO (Ref stop/three knockdowns by lowkicks) || 2 ||
|-  style="background:#fbb;"
| 2011-04-09|| Loss ||align=left| Mike Zambidis || W5 Grand Prix K.O, Final || Moscow, Russia || Decision (Unanimous)|| 3 ||3:00 	
|-
! style=background:white colspan=9 |
|-  style="background:#cfc;"
| 2011-04-09|| Win ||align=left| William Diender || W5 Grand Prix K.O, Semi Final || Moscow, Russia || Decision (Unanimous) || 3 || 3:00
|-  style="background:#cfc;"
| 2011-03-12 || Win  ||align=left| Chris van Venrooij || Oktagon 2011 in Milan || Milan, Italy || KO (Left hooks) || 1|| 1:46
|-  style="background:#cfc;"
| 2011-01-22 || Win ||align=left| Ricardo Lecca || KnocKOut - Oktagon K-1 || Rome, Italy || KO || 1 ||
|-  style="background:#cfc;"
| 2010-12-19 || Win ||align=left| Daud Arapiev || Tatneft Cup 2011 1st selection 1/8 final || Kazan, Russia || KO (Left hook) || 1 || 3:00
|-  style="background:#cfc;"
| 2010-11-27 || Win ||align=left| William Sriyapai || K-1 Scandinavia Rumble of the Kings 2010 || Stockholm, Sweden || TKO || 2 || 1:32
|-  style="background:#cfc;"
| 2010-10-20 || Win ||align=left| Uranbek Essenkulov || TatNeft Arena World Cup 2010, Final || Kazan, Russia || Decision || 6 || 2:00 
|-
! style=background:white colspan=9 |
|-  style="background:#fbb;"
| 2010-09-24 || Loss ||align=left| Greg Foley || JabOut Presents QUEST || Sydney, Australia || Decision || 3 || 3:00
|-  style="background:#cfc;"
| 2010-07-29 || Win ||align=left| Armen Israelyan || TatNeft Arena World Cup 2010, Semi Finals || Kazan, Russia || KO (Lowkick) || 3 ||
|-  style="background:#cfc;"
| 2010-05-29 || Win ||align=left| William Diender || It's Showtime 2010 Amsterdam || Amsterdam, Netherlands || Ext.R Decision (5-0) || 4 || 3:00
|-  style="background:#cfc;"
| 2010-04-30 || Win ||align=left| Danila Utenkov || TatNeft Arena World Cup 2010, Quarter Finals || Kazan, Russia || TKO (Ref Stop/Gave Up) || 4 || 1:46
|-  style="background:#fbb;"
| 2010-03-13 || Loss ||align=left| Armen Petrosyan || Oktagon presents: It's Showtime 2010 || Milan, Italy || Decision || 3 || 3:00
|-  style="background:#cfc;"
| 2010-01-31 || Win ||align=left| Tadas Jonkus || TatNeft Arena World Cup 2010, 1st Round|| Kazan, Russia || KO (Low kicks)|| 3 ||
|-  style="background:#fbb;"
| 2010-01-16 || Loss ||align=left| Nonsai Sor.Sanyakorn || Thailand vs Challenger Series || Bangkok, Thailand || Decision || 5 || 3:00
|-  style="background:#fbb;"
| 2009-11-20 || Loss ||align=left| Mike Zambidis || War of the Worlds || Melbourne, Australia || Decision (Majority) || 5 || 3:00
|-  style="background:#fbb;"
| 2009-08-29 || Loss ||align=left| Cosmo Alexandre || Evolution 17 || Brisbane, Australia || Decision (Unanimous) || 3 || 3:00
|-  style="background:#cfc;"
| 2009-07-13 || Win ||align=left| Hinata Watanabe || K-1 World MAX 2009 Final 8, Super Fight || Tokyo, Japan || Ext.R Decision (Unanimous) || 4 || 3:00
|-  style="background:#fbb;"
| 2009-04-21 || Loss ||align=left| Giorgio Petrosyan || K-1 World MAX 2009 Final 16 || Fukuoka, Japan || KO (Left Knee Strike) || 3 || 0:49
|-
! style=background:white colspan=9 |
|-  style="background:#fbb;"
| 2009-02-27 || Loss ||align=left| Marcus Öberg || K-1 Rumble of the Kings Norrköping 2009 || Norrköping, Sweden || Ext.R Decision (Unanimous) || 4 || 3:00
|-  style="background:#cfc;"
| 2008-12-06 || Win ||align=left| Bruce Macfie || Evolution 15 "The Contender Qualifier" || Brisbane, Australia || KO (Right Overhand) || 1 || 2:30
|-  style="background:#cfc;"
| 2008-11-06 || Win ||align=left| Chris van Venrooij || Hong Kong Contender || Hong Kong || Decision (Split) || 5 || 3:00
|-  style="background:#cfc;"
| 2008-10-31 || Win ||align=left| Denis Schneidmiller || K-1 Scandinavia Rumble of the Kings 2008 || Luleå, Sweden || Decision (Unanimous) || 5 || 3:00
|-
! style=background:white colspan=9 |
|-  style="background:#fbb;"
| 2008-09-20 || Loss ||align=left| Denis Schneidmiller || S-Cup Europe 2008, Final || Gorinchem, Netherlands || Decision (Split) || 3 || 3:00
|-
! style=background:white colspan=9 |
|-  style="background:#cfc;"
| 2008-09-20 || Win ||align=left| Chris van Venrooij || S-Cup Europe 2008, Semi Finals || Gorinchem, Netherlands || Decision (Unanimous) || 3 || 3:00
|-  style="background:#cfc;"
| 2008-09-20 || Win ||align=left| Rudolf Durica || S-Cup Europe 2008, Quarter Finals || Gorinchem, Netherlands || Decision (Unanimous) || 3 || 3:00
|-  style="background:#fbb;"
| 2008-09-16 || Loss ||align=left| John Wayne Parr || Evolution 14 "The Contenders" || Brisbane, Australia || Decision (Unanimous) || 5 || 3:00
|-  style="background:#fbb;"
| 2008-05-31 || Loss ||align=left| Marcus Öberg || K-1 Scandinavia MAX 2008, Final || Stockholm, Sweden || TKO (Ref Stop/Cut) || 3 || 0:34
|-
! style=background:white colspan=9 |
|-  style="background:#cfc;"
| 2008-05-31 || Win ||align=left| Marco Piqué || K-1 Scandinavia MAX 2008, Semi Finals || Stockholm, Sweden || Ext.R Decision (Unanimous) || 4 || 3:00
|-  style="background:#cfc;"
| 2008-05-31 || Win ||align=left| Jordan Tai || K-1 Scandinavia MAX 2008, Quarter Finals || Stockholm, Sweden || TKO (Eye Injury) || 2 || 0:41
|-  style="background:#cfc;"
| 2008-04-12 || Win ||align=left| Rafik Bakkouri || The Contender Asia Finale, Super Fight || Singapore || Decision || 5 || 3:00
|-
! style=background:white colspan=9 |
|-  style="background:#cfc;"
| 2007-12-29 || Win ||align=left| Eik The Dragon || Kedah Muaythai Challenge || Kulim, Malaysia || KO (Spinning Back Kick) || 1 ||
|-  style="background:#fbb;"
| 2007-12-05 || Win ||align=left| Jonathan Camara || King's Birthday 2007, Semi Finals || Bangkok, Thailand || Decision || 3 || 3:00
|-  style="background:#cfc;"
| 2007-12-05 || Win ||align=left| Jamie Crawford || King's Birthday 2007, Quarter Finals || Bangkok, Thailand || KO || 2 ||
|-  style="background:#fbb;"
| 2007-10-? || Loss ||align=left| John Wayne Parr || The Contender Asia, Episode 14, 3rd Round || Singapore || Decision (Unanimous) || 5 || 3:00 
|-
! style=background:white colspan=9 |
|-  style="background:#cfc;"
| 2007-10-? || Win ||align=left| Soren Monkongtong || The Contender Asia, Episode 12, 2nd Round || Singapore || KO (Right Overhand) || 1 ||
|-  style="background:#cfc;"
| 2007-09-? || Win ||align=left| David Paquette || The Contender Asia, Episode 6, 1st Round || Singapore || Decision || 5 || 3:00
|-  style="background:#fbb;"
| 2007-03-17 || Loss ||align=left| Buakaw Por. Pramuk || K-1 East Europe MAX 2007 || Vilnius, Lithuania || Decision (unanimous) || 3 || 3:00
|-  style="background:#fbb;"
| 2006-12-27 || Loss ||align=left| Wanlop Sitpholek || Sitpholek Muaythai Promotion || Pattaya, Thailand || Decision || 5 || 3:00
|-  style="background:#fbb;"
| 2006-12-05 || Loss ||align=left| Wanlop Sitpholek || King's Birthday 2006, Final || Bangkok, Thailand || Decision || 3 || 3:00
|-
! style=background:white colspan=9 |
|-  style="background:#cfc;"
| 2006-12-05 || Win ||align=left| Jomhod Kiatadisak || King's Birthday 2006, Semi Finals || Bangkok, Thailand || Decision || 3 || 3:00
|-  bgcolor="#FFBBBB"
| 2006-07-26 || Loss ||align=left| Vitaly Gurkov || S-1 European Championships: Tsunami 2, Quarter Finals || Kaliningrad, Russia || Decision (Unanimous) || 3 || 3:00
|-  style="background:#fbb;"
| 2006-03-17 || Loss ||align=left| Sergei Makagonov || K-1 Russia MAX 2006, Final || Kaliningrad, Russia || Decision || 3 || 3:00
|-
! style=background:white colspan=9 |
|-  style="background:#cfc;"
| 2006-03-17 || Win ||align=left| Azamat Abdulazizov || K-1 Russia MAX 2006, Semi Finals || Kaliningrad, Russia || Decision (Unanimous) || 3 || 3:00
|-  style="background:#cfc;"
| 2006-03-17 || Win ||align=left| Sandris Tomsons || K-1 Russia MAX 2006, Quarter Finals || Kaliningrad, Russia || Decision (Unanimous) || 3 || 3:00
|-
|-  style="background:#fbb;"
|-
! style=background:white colspan=9 |
|-  style="background:#cfc;"
| 2005-08-27 || Win ||align=left| || Muay Thai Against Drugs || Pattaya, Thailand || || ||
|-
! style=background:white colspan=9 |
|-  style="background:#cfc;"
| 2004-12-28 || Win ||align=left| Sergey Shurko || R.M.T.L. - Turuk vs Pashayev || Moscow, Russia || Decision (Unanimous) || 5 || 3:00
|-  style="background:#cfc;"
| 2004-12-07 || Win ||align=left| Alexey Makaryev || R.M.T.L. - Makaryev vs Askerov || Moscow, Russia || Decision (Unanimous) || 5 || 3:00
|-  style="background:#cfc;"
| 2004-11-09 || Win ||align=left| Vitaly Bolshanin || R.M.T.L. - Isaev vs Makaryev || Moscow, Russia || Decision (Unanimous) || 5 || 3:00
|-  style="background:#cfc;"
| 2004-10-05 || Win ||align=left| Rotislav Mekto || R.M.T.L. - Mekto vs Askerov || Moscow, Russia || KO || 3 ||
|-
| colspan=9 | Legend''':

Mixed martial arts record

|-
|Win
|align=center|4–0
|Jonathan Tuhu
|KO (punch)
|Hex Fight Series 23
|
|align=center|2
|align=center|0:25
|Melbourne, Australia
|
|-
|-
|Win
|align=center|3–0
|Jean Michel Mbok
|TKO (punches)
|OFS - Octagon Fighting Sensation 6
|
|align=center|1
|align=center|3:08
|Moscow, Russia
|
|-
|-
|Win
|align=center|2–0
|Roman Gundarenko
|KO
|Tech-Krep FC - Prime Selection 3
|
|align=center|2
|align=center|0:25
|Krasnodar, Russia
|
|-
|-
|Win
|align=center|1–0
|Gazimirza Gaziteev
|TKO (doctor stoppage)
|Oplot Challenge 109 - Oplot Counterattack
|
|align=center|2
|align=center|5:00
|Moscow, Russia
|
|-

See also
The Contender Asia
List of K-1 champions
List of male kickboxers

References

1986 births
Living people
Russian male kickboxers
Welterweight kickboxers
Russian male mixed martial artists
Dagestani mixed martial artists
Lightweight mixed martial artists
Mixed martial artists utilizing Muay Thai
Mixed martial artists utilizing kickboxing
Mixed martial artists utilizing boxing
Russian Muay Thai practitioners
Russian expatriate sportspeople in Australia
Russian expatriate sportspeople in Thailand
Russian people of Lezgian descent
The Contender (TV series) participants
Kunlun Fight kickboxers
ONE Championship kickboxers
Russian male boxers
Sportspeople from Dagestan